Björn Kopplin (born 7 January 1989) is a German professional footballer who plays as a right-back for Danish Superliga club Randers FC.

Club career
Kopplin was named in Bayern Munich's squad for the 2008–09 and 2009–10 UEFA Champions League. He was given the number 37 in the first team. On 13 June 2010, VfL Bochum announced that they had signed Kopplin for the following season. 

In 2017, Kopplin was signed by Danish team, Hobro IK.

On 26 October 2018, Randers FC announced that they had signed Kopplin from Brøndby IF. He would join the club at the end of 2018.

International career
Kopplin was part of the Germany squad that won the 2008 UEFA Under-19 Championship. Kopplin is member of the Germany U20 team and played with the team at 2009 FIFA U-20 World Cup and scored two goals in the Round of 16.

Career statistics

References

External links
 
 

1989 births
Living people
German footballers
German expatriate footballers
Association football defenders
Germany youth international footballers
2. Bundesliga players
3. Liga players
Regionalliga players
Danish Superliga players
Danish 1st Division players
FC Bayern Munich II players
VfL Bochum players
1. FC Union Berlin players
SC Preußen Münster players
Hobro IK players
Brøndby IF players
Randers FC players
Footballers from Berlin
Expatriate men's footballers in Denmark
German expatriate sportspeople in Denmark